Mariya Nazarivna Yaremchuk (born 2 March 1993), also transliterated as Maria Yaremchuk, is a Ukrainian singer and actress. Yaremchuk represented Ukraine in the Eurovision Song Contest 2014 held in Copenhagen, Denmark. She finished the 6th in the grand final out of 26 countries.

Early life 
Yaremchuk was born in Chernivtsi and is the daughter of People's Artist of Ukraine and singer, musician Nazariy Yaremchuk and his second wife, Darina. Mariya was named after her paternal grandmother. Yaremchuk's father died of stomach cancer when she was two years old. Friends and family have stated that Mariya was very dear to her well-known father.

Yaremchuk has an older half-sister Vera from her mother's first marriage and two brothers by her father's side, Dmytro and Nazariy. People's Artist and Hero of Ukraine Vasyl Zinkevych is her godfather.

Yaremchuk considers herself an apolitical person, but in December 2013 she declared that she "in the elections and in general, morally, and as a singer" supported (the political party) Party of Regions.

Music career

2012: Holos Krayiny and New Wave 2012 
Yaremchuk was a finalist of the TV project Holos Krainy. She reached fourth place. In 2012, she represented Ukraine at the international contest of young singers New Wave 2012, where she came in third. Yaremchuk was sponsored by Rinat Akhmetov during this festival. Akhmetov is friends with, one of the organizers of New Wave, Igor Krutoy. Mariya also participated in Evrobachennya 2013 – Natsionalyni vidbir, the national final used for finding Ukraine's representative in the Eurovision Song Contest, where Mariya came fifth with the song "Imagine".

2013–2014: Eurovision Song Contest 

On 21 December 2013, Yaremchuk won the Ukrainian national final for the Eurovision Song Contest 2014 with her song "Tick-Tock". On 6 May 2014 was held the first semi-final of the Eurovision Song Contest and Mariya qualified in the Grand Final. In the Grand Final, she finished sixth out of 26 countries.

During her Eurovision participation, Yaremchuk received a lot of international media attention due to her being the Ukrainian representative in a contest with Russia in the wake of the Crimean Crisis. At the #HappyWall in Copenhagen, Yaremchuk wrote "Proud to be Ukrainian".

2014-2018: Further success in Ukraine and acting debut
After the Eurovision Song Contest, Yaremchuk released a string of singles. In 2015, she released a cover of her father's signature song "Rodyna" on the day of the twentieth anniversary of his passing. Following that, she released "Do tebe" in 2016. In 2017, Yaremchuk released "Ty v meni ye", which music video was filmed by Alan Badoev. "Ty ve meni ye" peaked at 105 of the TopHit radio charts.

In March 2018, The Legend of Carpathians (Ukrainian: Легенда Карпат) was premiered at the 70th Cannes Film Festival. In this film, Yaremchuk portrayed Marichka, the lover of folklore hero Oleksa Dovbush.

2018-present: hiatus
In early 2018, Yaremchuk's manager announced that the singer is going on an indefinite hiatus.

Since then, she did not release any material, nor appeared at concerts and on television programmes.  Yaremchuk stopped updating her social media pages in May 2018, but returned shortly in June 2020 to post two Instagram posts to promote Netflix's film Eurovision Song Contest: The Story of Fire Saga, which was partially inspired by her Eurovision 2014 stage performance.

Private life
Yaremchuk states that she belongs to the Hutsul ethnic group. As of 2021, she resides in Lviv.

Discography

Singles

Notes

References

External links 

 Official website
 

1993 births
Eurovision Song Contest entrants of 2014
Living people
Musicians from Chernivtsi
Articles containing video clips
Ukrainian pop singers
Eurovision Song Contest entrants for Ukraine
The Voice of Ukraine contestants
Ukrainian folk-pop singers
Hutsuls
21st-century Ukrainian women singers